The Gendarmerie Nationale is the national gendarmerie of Niger. The Gendarmerie Nationale are under the Niger Armed Forces and report to the Ministry of Defense. They are responsible for law enforcement in rural areas. Niger's civilian police force, the National Police, is a separate agency under the Ministry of Interior, Public Safety and Decentralization, and are responsible for policing in urban areas.

The Gendarmerie Nationale numbers approximately 3,700 members. The Gendarmerie Nationale is modeled on the National Gendarmerie of its former colonial power, France. As a paramilitary, it is uniformed, ranked and trained in military fashion.

The Gendarmerie Nationale sponsors a semi-professional football club, Union Sportive de la Gendarmerie Nationale, which plays in the Super Ligue.

History 
Following the creation of the Republic of Niger and in anticipation of its independence, the Gendarmerie Nationale began transferring leadership to Nigerien officers. In August 1962, Lieutenant Badie Garba replaced Captain Maurice Dapremont then Superior Commander of the Gendarmerie Nationale, becoming the first Nigerien head of the Gendarmerie.

Structure and organization

The Gendarmerie Nationale is headquartered in Niamey and has four regional Groupements based in Niamey, Agadez, Maradi, and Zinder. A highway police unit known as the Brigade Routière is also a part of the Gendarmerie Nationale, charged with providing security to the nation's highways. The unit mainly operates highway checkpoints.

Specialised units
The GN includes police patrol and institutional security units, as well as specialised units, including a Niamey Motorcycle Unit for traffic and VIP escort duty, a Telecommunications section, and a nautical unit.

Fluvial Brigade 

In the wake of the Boko Haram insurgency in Nigeria and the Tuareg Rebellion of 2007–2009 in Mali, Niger has moved to ensure adequate patrolling of the Niger river in Niger. The goal of this brigade is to ensure safety of people and resources on the river and to prevent trafficking in any nature that might contribute to the regional conflicts.     
The Fluvial Brigade of the Gendarmerie Nationale was created in 2008 and equipped with three patrol boats acquired from France. The role of this brigade is to conduct riverine patrols in Niamey, Tillaberi, and Gaya. This brigade works closely with custom services to address fluvial and riverine trafficking on the Niger river. Training and exchanges are carried out with regional partners such as Mali and Senegal as well as France. The latter has also provided logistical support in the form of patrol boats.

Ranks

School and Training
As of 2008, training of the Gendarmerie Nationale is conducted at the National Gendarmerie School at Koira Tagui in Niamey. Training was previously conducted at Camp Tondibiah, a military base in Niamey and the primary training center for the Army corps. The first graduating class of the school included 1000 gendarmes, of whom 70 were women.

See also
Law enforcement in Niger

References

Gendarmerie Nationale du Niger. African Development Information Database. Accessed 2009-06-10.

Government of Niger
Law enforcement in Niger
Military of Niger